The Waanyi people, also spelt Wanyi, Wanji, or Waanji, are an Aboriginal Australian people from south of the Gulf of Carpentaria in Queensland and the Northern Territory.

Language
 
The Waanyi language, although earlier thought to be extinct, was found in the 2016 Australian census to have 16 speakers. This was down from the recorded peak of 40 in the 2011 Australian census. It is classified as one of the Garrwan languages.

Country
The Waanyi territory was in well-watered limestone and sandstone country, including parts of the Gregory River. Their eastern extension lay at the Barkly (Barclay) River, Lawn Hill and Bannockburn. Their western frontier was at Old Benmara, and south-west they roamed as far as Mount Morgan.

They lay south of the Kunindiri and Garrwa people, west of the Injilarija and Nguburinji peoples, and east of the Wambaya and Wakaya peoples' lands. They took over the land of the Injilarija, who were considered extinguished around 1880, around Lawn Hill (today part of Boodjamulla National Park).

History
The whole area of the north was affected deeply by the pastoral boom opened up in 1881 in the Northern Territory, with massive stations under the control of a few eastern investors hastily stocked with cattle: the key watering sites were locked out, tribes were shot at sight, and many groups moved east into the Gulf of Carpentaria, where the same phenomenon repeated itself. The Waanyi and the Garrwa, like many tribes local to the area that found their lands taken over for pastoral leases and resisted dispossession, found themselves threatened. The Eastern Waanyi were wiped out; settler vigilantes and police magistrates employed native mounted troopers to ambush, murder and massacre any Aboriginal groups they came across. The lessees of Gregory Downs submitted testimony in 1880 that the police rounded up blacks and then shot them, while that of Lawn Hill five years later said that on his cattle run alone police had shot over a hundred blacks in three years, without achieving their aim of stopping the killing of livestock. The displaced Waanyi eventually took over the territory in the Lawn Hill area of the extinct Injilarija.

Native title

The Waanyi first lodged a native title claim over an area known to them traditionally as Wugujaji in June 1994. Under a Queensland Government land act of 1989, CZL was granted two mining leases covering 23,585 hectares extending through Waanyi land the Century Mine was established on it. Eventually the terms of a settlement were agreed on, and CZL paid funding, training and employment to the traditional peoples, an accord known as the $90 million offer.

The Waanyi claim a right to co-manage both the Boodjamulla National Park and Riversleigh World Heritage Area, the latter holding the richest Oligocene and Miocene mammalian and reptile fossil field in the world. In 2010, native title was granted over an area of  abutting the Northern Territory border, including Boodjamulla, after litigation.

In 2018 a second case was brought for two areas to the west of Doomadgee, one from Turn Off Lagoon as far as the NT border, and the other close to the border of Doomadgee Shire, and Burketown, covering . Native title was formally recognised by consent by the Federal Court of Australia on 22 September 2021,  with its timing coinciding with new funding from the Queensland Government for four Indigenous rangers to work in the Boodjamulla and the Riversleigh.

Notable people
 Alexis Wright, a writer of Waanyi descent whose novel Carpentaria (2006) won the prestigious Australian Miles Franklin Award.

Alternative names
 Waangyee
 Wanee
 Wanji
 Wanyee
 Wonyee

Source :

Notes

Citations

Sources

External links

Aboriginal peoples of the Northern Territory
Aboriginal peoples of Queensland